The Never Ending Tour is the popular name for Bob Dylan's endless touring schedule since June 7, 1988.  His tally for this year was 100 shows.

Background
The Never Ending Tour 1989 started in Sweden with a performance at Christinehof's Slottspark on May 22. This was only the fourth time that Dylan had performed in Sweden. He then performed in Finland, his second performance there, before returning to Sweden. He then performed two concerts in Dublin, Ireland, the first time that he had performed there since 1965. Dylan then performed in Glasgow, Scotland his second only performance in the city. The first being in 1966. After performing concerts in Birmingham and London Dylan performed in the Netherlands, Belgium and France, Dylan performed three concerts in Spain, four in Italy, a single concert in Turkey and two concerts in Greece.

After finishing the European tour Dylan returned to the United States performing at many of the same venues that he had performed in the year before, on the first year of the Never Ending Tour. Dylan continued to perform in the United States and Canada until November 15.

Tour dates

Notes

References

External links
BobLinks – Comprehensive log of concerts and set lists
Bjorner's Still on the Road – Information on recording sessions and performances

Bob Dylan concert tours
1989 concert tours